Izzat Hayat Khan (also written Izzat Hyat-Khan sometimes) (16 August 1929 - 6 October 2002), was a businessman who served Pakistan as Ambassador to Tunisia, and as representative to the Arab League from 1980 to 1983.

Early life and education

He attended the leading preparatory boarding school Prince of Wales Royal Indian Military College (now Rashtriya Indian Military College) in Dehra Dun, India, India.

Key Career Events

After graduating, Khan joined Glaxo Laboratories' Executive Management Training program in the UK. At Glaxo, he held various executive management roles and was a member of the M&A team at Glaxo that completed the acquisition of Allen & Hanbury's in early 1958. In 1966, he set up F&I Industries (Pvt.) Limited,  in Islamabad, Pakistan, a sugar confectionery products manufacturing company.

In 1980, Khan was nominated to build ties with Maghreb nations by serving as a specially politically appointed Ambassador to Tunisia and Special Envoy to the Arab League, by the Pakistani dictator and president General Zia-ul-Haq.

Later life

References

1929 births
2002 deaths
Izzat
Ambassadors of Pakistan to Tunisia
People from Attock District